Charles Bannister (born 22 May 1956) is an English cricketer. He played seventeen first-class matches for Cambridge University Cricket Club between 1975 and 1977.

See also
 List of Cambridge University Cricket Club players

References

External links
 

1956 births
Living people
English cricketers
Cambridge University cricketers
People from Redhill, Surrey
British Universities cricketers
Hertfordshire cricketers